Ovako AB is a European manufacturer of engineering steel for customers e.g. in the bearing, transportation and manufacturing industries. Since 2018, Ovako has been owned by Nippon Steel Corporation.

The production is based on recycled scrap and includes steel in the form of bar, tube, ring and pre-components. Ovako is one of the world's largest manufacturers of seamless tubes for the bearing industry.

Operations 

Ovako produces bars, tubes, rings and pre-components. Ovako also produces steels for mining, rock drilling and construction applications. The company has 9 production sites in Sweden, Finland, the Netherlands, Germany and Italy, and several sales companies in Europe, Asia and the United States.

Ovako steel is made from recycled scrap that is then refined and transformed into products such as hot-rolled or cold-rolled bars with various profiles and forms of processing, tubes, rings and pre-components.

Ovako's customers are primarily the European engineering industry and its subcontractors, for example makers of trucks, contracting plant and industrial applications, the mining industry and the wind power industry. The majority of Ovako's products are sold to customers in Europe but steel is also exported to North America and Asia.

Sales in 2015 were EUR 834 million and the number of employees is 2 900 (March 2022). Operations are divided into three business areas: Hofors-Hällefors, Smedjebacken-Boxholm and Imatra.

Marcus Hedblom has been CEO of Ovako since 2015. The chairman of Ovako's board of directors is Mr Katsuhiro Miyamoto.

Products 

Ovako operates on the market for long, low alloy steel products. The majority of production consists of bars, tubes and rings that are used in items such as ball bearings, products for the automotive industry, hydraulic cylinders and rock drills.

Ovako specialises in steel with a high degree of purity and low oxygen content, steel with improved machining properties and boron steel with high abrasion resistance. 
Ovako is Europe's biggest manufacturer of piston rods for the hydraulics industry via its CROMAX group of companies. These are low carbon, hard chromium-plated rods of high-strength steel.

Production sites 

Ovako has 9 production sites: Boxholm, Hallstahammar, Hofors, Hällefors and Smedjebacken in Sweden, Imatra in Finland, Molinella in Italy, Redon in France and Almelo in the Netherlands. The company also has sales offices in a number of countries worldwide.

History 

Ovako's production is a further development of some of the ironworks set up in Sweden in the 17th and 18th centuries in places such as Hofors, Boxholm and Hällefors. The ironworks gradually grew into major industrial centers and subsequently belonged to the companies that merged to form Ovako today.

1900s-1950s
Ball bearing steel was produced in Sweden at the beginning of the 20th century. In 1916, SKF acquired Hofors Bruk, followed in 1958 by Hellefors Bruk. 1935 saw the start of production of steel in Imatra, Finland, where Ovako still operates today, as it does in Hofors and Hällefors.

1960s-1970s
The steel industry developed, and new technology meant that it was possible to produce steel of higher quality in a shorter time. The predecessors of what is Ovako today gradually began to focus production on special steel. During the same period, the steelworks in Smedjebacken, Hofors and Imatra supplied increasing volumes of steel to the automotive and engineering industries.

In 1969, the Finnish steel companies Oy Vuoksenniska Ab and Oy Fiskars Ab formed a joint company: Ovako. In 1972, Wärtsilä became a shareholder in the company.

1980s-1990s
In 1981, Smedjebackens Walsverk and Boxholms AB merged to form Smedjebacken-Boxholm Stål AB. In 1988, the company was acquired by Welbond, which subsequently changed its name to Fundia.

In 1986, Ovako Steel was formed via a merger of SKF Steel and Ovako. In 1991, SKF became sole owner of Ovako Steel, while operations in Imatra continued under the name Imatra Steel. In the same year, Fundia was acquired by Rautaruukki Oy and Norsk Jern Holding A/S.

2000s-2010s
In 2005, the present company Ovako was formed via a merger of Fundia, Ovako Steel and Imatra Steel. The company is owned jointly by Rautaruukki, SKF and Wärtsila. In 2006, Ovako was sold to Pampus Industrie Beteiligungen and the Dutch investors Hombergh Holdings BV and WP de Pundert Ventures BV. In 2007, Pampus Industrie Beteiligungen became the sole owner.

In 2010, Ovako was sold to Triton, which took over everything except the wire rod division from the company.

In 2018 Ovako was sold to Nippon Steel.

2020s
In 2020, Ovako demonstrated the first use of hydrogen to heat steel before rolling.
As of january 2022, Ovako counterbalance all remaining CO2 emissions from Scope 1 and Scope 2 and is therefore the first carbon neutral steel producer in the world.

Management 
Marcus Hedblom, President & CEO
Disa Wollf, Acting CFO, EVP Group Finance, IT & Purchasing
Phetra Ericsson, EVP Group HR, Communication & EHS
Mathias Tillman, EVP Group Sales & Marketing
Rickard Qvarfort, President BU Hofors-Hellefors
Klaus Enwald, President BU Imatra
Hiromi Ishii, EVP Group Production & Technology Advisor
Nicholas Källsäter, President BU Smedjebacken-Boxholm

References

Steel companies of Sweden
Wärtsilä
Companies established in 1969
Finnish companies established in 1969